Janhova is a small dispersed settlement in the Municipality of Apače in northeastern Slovenia.

References

External links 
Janhova on Geopedia

Populated places in the Municipality of Apače